The following is a partial list of solar eclipses visible from Israel.

Twentieth century

Twenty-first century

Total and annular solar eclipses visible from cities 
The following is a list of total and annular solar eclipses visible from selected cities in Israel.

Jerusalem 
The last total solar eclipse visible from Jerusalem occurred on Sunday, August 20, 993, and the next one will not occur until Sunday, August 8, 2241.
 1655 February 6 (annular)
 1820 September 7 (annular)
 1933 August 21 (annular)
 2241 August 8 (total)
 2276 March 16 (annular)
 2447 July 13 (annular)
 2548 August 5 (total)
 2704 September 21 (annular)
 2732 September 11 (annular)
 2934 October 29 (annular)

Haifa 
 1655 February 6 (annular)
 1676 June 11 (annular)
 1709 March 11 (annular)
 1773 March 23 (annular)
 2276 March 16 (annular)
 2447 July 13 (annular)
 2704 September 21 (annular)
 2732 September 11 (annular)
 2950 July 6 (annular)

Tel Aviv 
 1655 February 6 (annular)
 1820 September 7 (annular)
 2276 March 16 (annular)
 2447 July 13 (annular)
 2548 August 5 (total)
 2704 September 21 (annular)
 2732 September 11 (annular)
 2934 October 29 (annular)

Beersheba 
 1133 August 2

References 

Israel
Historical events in Israel
Solar eclipses